Croft is a village and civil parish in the Borough of Warrington in Cheshire, England, north of the town of Warrington.  It contains 13 buildings that are recorded in the National Heritage List for England as designated listed buildings.  All of these are listed at Grade II, the lowest of the three gradings given to listed buildings, applied to "buildings of national importance and special interest".  The parish is mainly rural, and other than a milestone its listed buildings are related to churches, houses or farms.

See also
Listed buildings in Wigan
Listed buildings in Culcheth and Glazebury
Listed buildings in Birchwood
Listed buildings in Poulton-with-Fearnhead
Listed buildings in St Helens
Listed buildings in Winwick

References
Citations

Sources

Listed buildings in Warrington
Lists of listed buildings in Cheshire